Basilio Labrador (born 29 March 1967) is a Spanish male former racewalking athlete. He competed mainly in the 50 kilometres race walk but later in his career moved towards 20 kilometres race walk. He set his personal best over 50 km at the 1993 World Championships in Athletics, where he placed fifth with 3:46:46 hours. His 20 km best of 1:32:31 hours was achieved in Jerez de la Frontera in 2003.

He was a five-time participant for Spain at the IAAF World Race Walking Cup, and twice competed at the European Athletics Championships, managing fourth at the 1990 event. Born in Los Realejos, he took up walking at the age of fifteen. He later studied physical education at the Universidad de La Laguna and earned a masters in sports governance.

International competitions

References

External links

Living people
1967 births
People from Tenerife
Sportspeople from the Province of Santa Cruz de Tenerife
Spanish male racewalkers
World Athletics Championships athletes for Spain